Gabriel Dawe (born 1973) is a Mexican-born artist living in Dallas, Texas, whose work is based on investigations of the visible spectrum of light. He has gained renown for his large-scale Plexus series of installations of sewing thread, though he also creates works on paper as well as other media. His work has been exhibited in the US, Canada, Belgium, Denmark, and the UK.

Background 
Originally from Mexico City, Dawe initially trained as a graphic designer, but during his studies at the University of Texas at Dallas, he began to investigate the connection between fashion and architecture. His use of materials related to textiles stems from a childhood frustration of not being allowed by his grandmother to learn traditional needlework because of societal expectations for boys.

Education 
He received his bachelor's degree in Graphic Design from Universidad de las Américas, Puebla, Mexico and his MFA at the University of Texas at Dallas, where he was an artist in residence at CentralTrak for the final two years of his degree.

Plexus series 
 
Named for the network of blood vessels or nerves that run throughout the body and form connections, Dawe's Plexus series are large-scale networks of sewing thread that are investigations of the visible spectrum of light. They are often site-specific, temporary commissions that the artist transforms into compacted displays of thread he calls relics when the exhibitions are over.

Most notably, the artist's work was part of the reopening of the Renwick Gallery in the exhibition Wonder. He has also installed Plexus works at the Amon Carter Museum of American Art, Brigham Young University, and the Denver Art Museum, among others.

Selected solo exhibitions

2016 
Plexus No. 34 : Amon Carter Museum of American Art : Fort Worth, TX

Plexus c18 : San Antonio International Airport : San Antonio, TX

2015 
Plexus A1 : Renwick Gallery of the Smithsonian American Art Museum : Washington, D.C.

2014 
Plexus No. 29 : Brigham Young University Museum of Art : Provo, UT (Has now been taken down) 

Requiem for a Fallen Structure : Conduit Gallery : Dallas, TX

Plexus No. 28 : Virginia Museum of Contemporary Art : Virginia Beach, VA 

Plexus No. 27 : Crystal Bridges : Bentonville, AR

Plexus No. 26 : Blue Star Contemporary Art Museum : San Antonio, TX 

Plexus No. 25 : Contemporary Art Museum, Raleigh : Raleigh, NC

2013            
Plexus No. 23 .1 : Museum Rijswijk : Rijswijk, Netherlands 

Threading Light : Zadok Gallery : Miami, FL

Light Paradox : Gutstein Gallery : Savannah College of Art and Design : Savannah, GA

2012 
Blinding Pain : Conduit Gallery : Dallas, TX

Plexus No. 15 : LSU Museum of Art : Baton Rouge, LA

The Density of Light : Galerie Lot 10 : Brussels, Belgium

Plexus No. 12 : The Juanita Harvey Art Gallery, MWSU : Wichita Falls, TX

2011 
Plexus No. 9 : Peel Gallery : Houston, TX

Plexus No. 8 : The Luminary Arts Center : St. Louis, MO

2010            

Plexus No. 4 : Dallas Contemporary : Annex North Gallery : Dallas, TX

Plexus No. 3 : Guerrilla Arts : Dallas, TX

Plexus No. 2, Convergence : Conduit Gallery : Project Room : Dallas, TX

2007            
Luz Gallery : Montreal, Canada

2004            
Luz Gallery : Montreal, Canada

2002            
The Light Within The Shadow : Rad’a Gallery : Montreal, Canada

References

1973 births
Living people
Mexican emigrants to the United States
Mexican artists
Artists from Mexico City